Hans Åke Jonsson (born August 2, 1973) is a Swedish former professional ice hockey player.

Career
Jonsson was drafted by the Pittsburgh Penguins in the 1993 NHL Entry Draft in the 11th round, as the 286th pick overall. He made his debut for the Penguins in 1999–00 season. After spending four seasons in Pittsburgh, Jonsson returned home to his native Sweden to play for Modo Hockey in 2003.

Career statistics

Regular season and playoffs

International

External links 
 

1973 births
Living people
Modo Hockey players
People from Örnsköldsvik Municipality
Pittsburgh Penguins draft picks
Pittsburgh Penguins players
Swedish ice hockey defencemen
Swedish expatriate ice hockey players in the United States
Sportspeople from Västernorrland County
20th-century Swedish people